The Hsinchu Industrial Park is an industrial park in Hukou Township, Hsinchu County, Taiwan.

History
The industrial park was opened in 1977.

Transportation
The industrial park is accessible within walking distance Western of Xinfeng Station of Taiwan Railways.

Major companies located in the park
 China Motor Corporation
 TRSC
 SYM Motors
 Ritek

See also
 Hsinchu Science Park

References

1977 establishments in Taiwan
Buildings and structures in Hsinchu
Industrial parks in Taiwan